Mihr-un-Nissa Begum (Persian: مهرالنسا بیگم; 28 September 1661 – 2 April 1706), meaning "Sun among women", was a Mughal princess, the fifth daughter of Mughal Emperor Aurangzeb and his consort Aurangabadi Mahal.

Birth
Mihr-un-Nissa Begum was born on 28 September 1661. Her mother was a concubine named Aurangabadi Mahal. She was the ninth child and fifth daughter born to her father, and the only child of her mother.

Marriage
Mihr-un-Nissa Begum married her first cousin, Izzad Bakhsh Mirza, the son of her paternal uncle Prince Murad Bakhsh Mirza, the youngest son of Emperor Shah Jahan. The marriage took place on 7 December 1672, after Izzad Bakhsh's release from the Gwalior fort. The marriage was performed in  the presence of Qaz Abdul Wahhab, Shaikh Nizam, Bakhtawar Khan an Darbar Khan. She was the mother of  two sons, Princes Dawar Bakhsh Mirza and Dadar Bakhsh Mirza.

Death
Mihr-un-Nissa Begum died on 2 April 1706, a year before her father's death. Her husband also died along with her.

References

Mughal princesses
1661 births
1706 deaths
Mughal nobility
Timurid dynasty
18th-century Indian Muslims
Indian female royalty
17th-century Indian women
17th-century Indian people
18th-century Indian women
Daughters of emperors